An alphabetized list of ecofeminist writers includes the following:

 Carol J. Adams
 Carol P. Christ
 Chris Cuomo
 Mary Daly
 Françoise d'Eaubonne
 Barbara Ehrenreich
 Clarissa Pinkola Estes
 Alice Fulton
 Greta Gaard
 Chellis Glendinning
 Alice Gorman
 Mary Grey
 Susan Griffin
 Donna Haraway
 Helena Norberg-Hodge
 Allison Hedge Coke
 Valerie Ann Kaaland
 Stephanie Kaza
 Petra Kelly
 Robin Wall Kimmerer
 Anna Kingsford
 Winona LaDuke
 Joanna Macy
 Wangari Muta Maathai
 Lynn Margulis
 Maria Mies
 Carolyn Merchant
 Layli Phillips
 Gloria Feman Orenstein
 Judith Plaskow
 Val Plumwood
 Alicia Puleo
 Arundhati Roy
 Rosemary Radford Ruether
 Ariel Salleh
 Carol Lee Sanchez
 Vandana Shiva
 Leanne Betasamosake Simpson
 Charlene Spretnak
 Starhawk
 Merlin Stone
 Sheri S. Tepper
 Mary Evelyn Tucker
 Douglas Vakoch
 Linda Vance
 Anne Waldman
 Alice Walker
 Barbara Walker
 Marilyn Waring
 Karen J. Warren
 Sheila Watt-Cloutier
 Laura Wright

Literature and poetry
 Kelli Russell Agodon
 Margaret Atwood
 Jean Auel
 Marion Zimmer Bradley
 Octavia Butler
 Natalie Diaz
 Annie Dillard
 Charlotte Perkins Gilman
 Geneen Marie Haugen
 Linda Hogan
 Sue Monk Kidd
 Sylvia Lindsteadt
 Ursula K. Le Guin
 Barbara Kingsolver
 Toni Morrison
 Mary Oliver
 Marge Piercy
 Nandini Sahu
 Eva Saulitis
 Alice Walker
 Terry Tempest Williams

 
Lists of women writers
Feminism-related lists